Dipodomyinae is a subfamily of heteromyid rodents, the kangaroo rats and mice. Dipodomyines, as implied by both their common and scientific names, are bipedal; they also jump exceptionally well.  Kangaroo rats and mice are native to desert and semidesert ecosystems of western North America from southern Canada to central Mexico. They are generally herbivorous foragers, and dig and live in burrows.

Taxonomy
Dipodomyinae is the sister group of a Perognathinae-Heteromyinae clade; the two are estimated to have split about 22-24 million years (Ma) ago. The most recent common ancestor of extant dipodomyines is thought to have lived 15-16 Ma ago, when the two genera split. The most recent common ancestors of extant members of Dipodomys and Microdipodops are thought to have lived 10-11 and 7-8 Ma ago, respectively.

Subfamily Dipodomyinae
Genus Dipodomys — kangaroo rats
Agile kangaroo rat, Dipodomys agilis
California kangaroo rat, Dipodomys californicus
Gulf Coast kangaroo rat, Dipodomys compactus
Desert kangaroo rat, Dipodomys deserti
Texas kangaroo rat, Dipodomys elator
Big-eared kangaroo rat, Dipodomys elephantinus
San Quintin kangaroo rat, Dipodomys gravipes
Heermann's kangaroo rat, Dipodomys heermanni
Giant kangaroo rat, Dipodomys ingens
Merriam's kangaroo rat, Dipodomys merriami
Chisel-toothed kangaroo rat, Dipodomys microps
Nelson's kangaroo rat, Dipodomys nelsoni
Fresno kangaroo rat, Dipodomys nitratoides
Ord's kangaroo rat, Dipodomys ordii
Panamint kangaroo rat, Dipodomys panamintinus
Phillips's kangaroo rat, Dipodomys phillipsii
Dulzura kangaroo rat, Dipodomys simulans
Banner-tailed kangaroo rat, Dipodomys spectabilis
Stephens's kangaroo rat, Dipodomys stephensi
Narrow-faced kangaroo rat, Dipodomys venustus
Genus Microdipodops — kangaroo mice
Pale kangaroo mouse, Microdipodops pallidus
Dark kangaroo mouse, Microdipodops megacephalus

References

Heteromyidae
Taxa named by Paul Gervais
Mammal subfamilies